Sulbactam is a β-lactamase inhibitor. This drug is given in combination with β-lactam antibiotics to inhibit β-lactamase, an enzyme produced by bacteria that destroys the antibiotics.

It was patented in 1977 and approved for medical use in 1986.

Medical uses
Sulbactam is able to inhibit the most common forms of β-lactamase but is not able to interact with the AmpC cephalosporinase. Thus, it confers little protection against bacteria such as Pseudomonas aeruginosa, Citrobacter, Enterobacter, and Serratia, which often express this gene.

In the United States, sulbactam is combined to form ampicillin/sulbactam. It does possess some antibacterial activity when administered alone, but it is too weak to have any clinical importance. Its use in the UK is restricted to hospitals.

The combination cefoperazone/sulbactam (Sulperazon) is available in many countries.

Recently, its use in treating Acinetobacter sepsis is receiving renewed interest.

Mechanism
Sulbactam is primarily used as a suicide inhibitor of β-lactamase, shielding more potent beta-lactams such as ampicillin. Sulbactam itself contains a beta-lactam ring, and has weak antibacterial activity by inhibiting penicillin binding proteins (PBP) 1 and 3, but not 2.

See also
 Sultamicillin, an ester of sulbactam with the penicillin antibiotic ampicillin
 Clavulanic acid
 Tazobactam

References

Further reading 
 

Beta-lactamase inhibitors
Lactams
Sulfones
Carboxylic acids